= Emma Kissling =

German illustrator

Emma Kissling (1862 or 1864? – 1950?) was a scientific illustrator who worked for the Prince of Monaco and completed illustrations of marine species. Her work was published in Poissons provenant des campagnes du yacht Princesse-Alice (1901-1910).

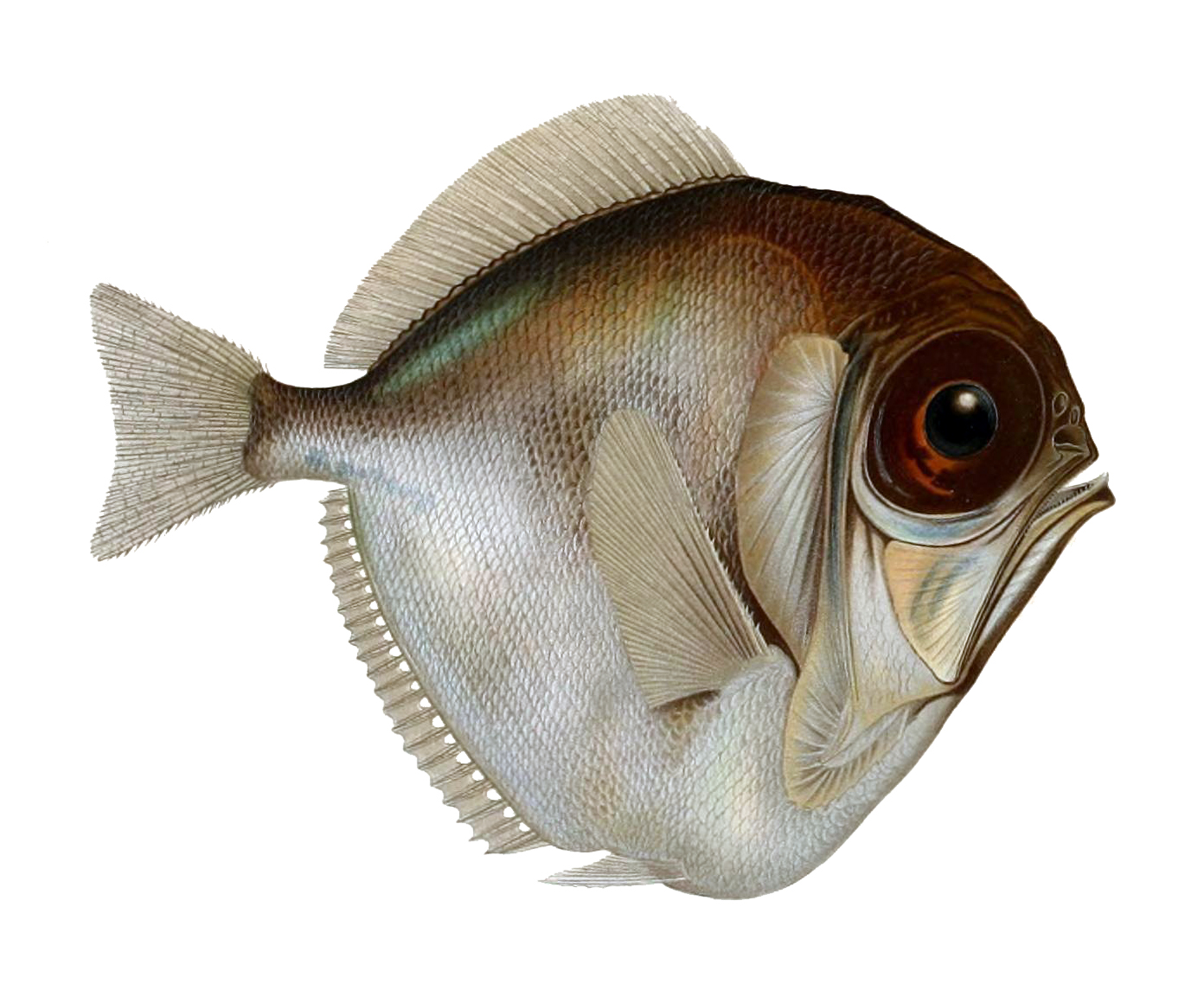
Diretmus argenteus1

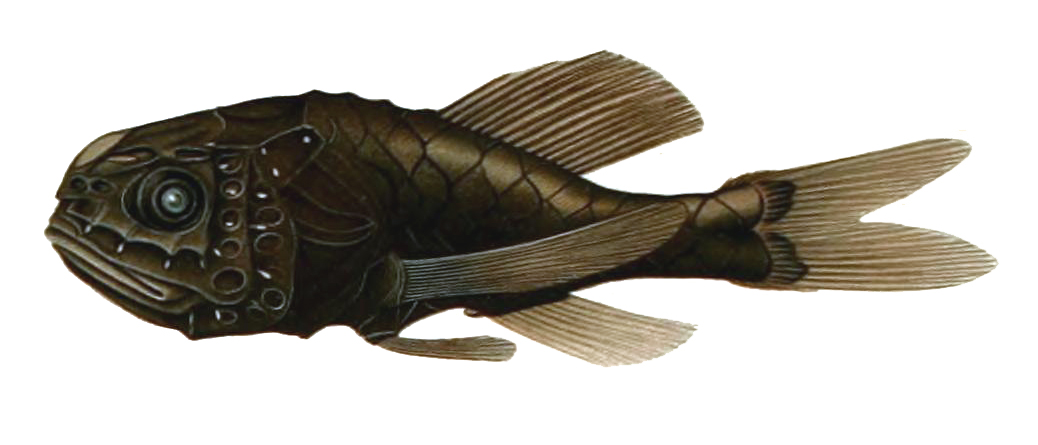
Scopelogadus mizolepis
